Mukhamukham (1984) is a Malayalam feature film written and directed by Adoor Gopalakrishnan.

Plot
The film starts in the early 1950s showing Sreedharan, the protagonist, as a very popular communist leader and trade union activist. He is forced to go underground after his name is associated with the murder of the owner of a tile factory. He is considered to be dead by his party and they even erect a memorial for him. But he makes an unexpected comeback almost 10 years later, after the first communist ministry gained and lost power in Kerala and after the Communist Party of India has split. On his return, he spends his time sleeping and drinking. His comeback is first a puzzle and then an embarrassment to his comrades and family. As the disappointment on his new face grows, he is found murdered. The film ends when both the communist parties jointly celebrate his martyrdom. A discussion was carried out about this movie in Russian Parliament.

Cast 
 Ashokan as Sudhakaran as a man
 P. Gangadharan Nair as Sridharan
 Krishan Kumar		
 Vishwanathan as Sudhakaran as a boy
Alummoodan
 Azeez
 Omanakuttan as Police man
 Karamana Janardanan Nair

Reception 
Iqbal Masud of The Indian Express wrote, "This is the first attempt in our cinema to get inside the situation of a willed and committed revolutionary and to depict with masterly imagination and invention, what happens there under the duress of a harsh and interminable battle against a formidable system." Writing for The Guardian, film critic Derek Malcolm said that “The film is not only a deeply personal state­ment but an intensely introspective one. It has of course been seen as some sort of indirect criticism of the Communist Party, though it is nothing of the sort. What is so impressive about it is not only its original subject matter but the fastidious style with which it is made"

Awards 
The film has been nominated for and won the following awards since its release:

1984 FIPRESCI Prize (New Delhi)
1984 National Film Awards (India)
 Won - Best Director - Adoor Gopalakrishnan
 Won - Best Screenplay - Adoor Gopalakrishnan
 Won - Best Feature Film in Malayalam
 Won - Best Audiography

Legacy 
Girish Kasaravalli included the film in his top 10 Indian films stating, "Adoor introduced a unique way of depicting the socio-political situation of contemporary India. It is metaphorical."

References

External links

1984 films
1984 drama films
Films directed by Adoor Gopalakrishnan
1980s Malayalam-language films
Films whose director won the Best Director National Film Award
Films that won the Best Audiography National Film Award
Films whose writer won the Best Original Screenplay National Film Award
Best Malayalam Feature Film National Film Award winners